Hyland River Provincial Park is a provincial park in British Columbia, Canada, located near the boundary with Yukon along the Alaska Highway just east of the community of Lower Post and north of the Liard River.  Established in 1964, the park is 34 ha. in area.

References

Provincial parks of British Columbia
Liard Country
2000 establishments in British Columbia
Protected areas established in 2000